Conopsia lambornella is a moth of the family Sesiidae. It is known from Nigeria.

References

Endemic fauna of Nigeria
Sesiidae
Lepidoptera of West Africa
Moths of Africa